A poster child (sometimes poster boy or poster girl) is, according to the original meaning of the term, a child afflicted by some disease or deformity whose picture is used on posters or other media as part of a campaign to raise money or enlist volunteers for a cause or organization. Such campaigns may be part of an annual effort or event, and may include the name and age of a specific child along with other personally identifiable attributes.

In modern times, a "poster child" is a person of any age whose attributes or behaviour are emblematic of a known cause, movement, circumstance or ideal. The person in question is thought of as an embodiment or archetype. This signifies that the very identity of the subject is synonymous with the associated ideal; or otherwise representative of its most favorable or least favorable aspects.

Examples 

 Bobbi Campbell was a self-professed "AIDS poster boy" in the earliest years of the epidemic.
 Willie Horton became a poster boy for the Massachusetts prison furlough program and the liberal sensibilities of Michael Dukakis in the 1988 United States presidential election campaign.
 Emily Susan Rapp was a poster child for the March of Dimes in Wyoming, following the amputation of her leg at age four, due to a congenital birth defect.
 Aziz Shavershian was described as the poster boy of a subculture of amateur bodybuilding in Australia, dubbed "aesthetics", and gained a large cult following of admirers.
 Ryan White was considered a poster child for social acceptance of AIDS sufferers, after he contracted the disease from a blood transfusion and was expelled from his school.

See also 

 Archetype
 Epitome
 Mascot

References 

Child
Childhood
Metaphors referring to people